Francisco "Paco" Gento López (21 October 1933 – 18 January 2022) was a Spanish footballer who played as an outside left. A fast runner, Gento was referred to as the "Gale of the Cantabrian Sea" in reference to his speed down the wing. He was voted by IFFHS (International Federation of Football History and Statistics) as the greatest Spanish footballer and 30th greatest world footballer of the 20th century.

Gento began his career at Racing Santander in 1952 and moved to Real Madrid the following season. He appeared in a joint record eight European Cup finals, winning a record six, as well as winning a record 12 La Liga titles. In a 14-year international career, Gento earned 43 caps for Spain, playing at the World Cup in 1962 and 1966.

Following the death of Alfredo Di Stéfano in 2014, Gento was appointed the Honorary President of Real Madrid.

Club career
Gento debuted in the Primera División with Racing Santander in the 1952–53 season. He was still playing mostly for the B team at Santander when a flu virus saw him promoted to the first team ahead of a home game against Real Madrid. Such was his performance in the match, that Madrid signed him three days later. La Galerna del Cantábrico (The Gale of the Cantabrian Sea), as he was known, played outside left and was noted for his exceptional pace, his skills with the ball and his scoring prowess from the midfield position. In 1967, following Alfredo Di Stéfano's departure and Ferenc Puskás's retirement, he became the captain of a young side, known in Spain as Ye-yé, because of the popularity of The Beatles at that time.

Gento did not score in his first season and was under pressure from club president Santiago Bernabéu. The president was won over by Di Stéfano's argument "he is quick and hits the ball like a cannon. That can't be learned, it's innate. We can teach him the rest".

Among other honors, Gento won the European Cup a record six times with Real Madrid between 1955 and 1966, being the only Madrid player to figure in all of the wins. He contributed with 31 goals in 88 European Cup career matches.

Gento played in eight European Cup finals, with a 6–2 record, and he also appeared in a ninth European final appearance in the 1970–1971 Cup Winners' Cup final that Real Madrid lost to Chelsea. He holds this record jointly with Milan's Paolo Maldini, who has an inferior 5–3 record. Gento's legendary Real Madrid teammate, Alfredo Di Stéfano's 5–2 record comes third.

Domestically, Gento collected 12 La Liga titles during his time with Madrid. He scored 128 times in 428 league appearances for the club, a strong return for a winger, especially as he was often providing goals for teammates Di Stéfano and Puskás. He won 23 trophies for the club, which remained an outright record until equalled by Marcelo days before Gento's death.

After he retired from football in 1971, he coached various lower-league teams, such as Castilla, Castellón, Palencia, and Granada. In 1978–79, he led Palencia to promotion to the Segunda División for the first time in their history. He later took up a role as an ambassador for Real Madrid throughout Europe, alongside Di Stéfano. After Di Stéfano died in 2014, Gento became the honorary president of the club.

International career
Gento played for the Spain national team from 1955 to 1969, winning 43 caps and scoring five times. His debut came on 18 May 1955 in a 1–1 draw with England in Madrid. He was initially known as "La tercera G" (the third G) for succeeding Agustín Gaínza and Guillermo Gorostiza in his position. His rival for his position was his friend Enrique Collar of Atlético Madrid, and the pair played together at the 1962 FIFA World Cup in Chile.

In 1964 European Nations' Cup qualification, Gento was included alongside Collar under new manager José Villalonga, but was dropped after a home defeat to Belgium on 1 December 1963; Carlos Lapetra took his place for the finals which Spain won. Due to improved form and fitness in the second half of the 1965–66 season, he was recalled for the 1966 FIFA World Cup in England, playing all three games of a group-stage elimination.

Shortly before turning 36, Gento was given his 43rd and final cap on 15 October 1969 by his former teammate László Kubala, in a 6–0 win over already eliminated Finland in 1970 FIFA World Cup qualification. He ended short of the record of 46 caps by Ricardo Zamora.

Personal life and death

Gento's two younger brothers, Julio (1939–2016) and Antonio (1940–2020) also played football professionally; the latter played for Real Madrid, too, but they were not as successful as their older brother Francisco.

His nephews were also athletes – José Luis Llorente and Toñín Llorente played basketball, whilst Paco Llorente and Julio Llorente were footballers. Grand-nephew Marcos Llorente, son of Paco Llorente, is also a footballer.

Gento died in his sleep on 18 January 2022, at the age of 88. 

Real Madrid announced in a statement, "Real Madrid would like to express its condolences and its love and affection to his wife Mari Luz, his sons Francisco and Julio, his granddaughters Aitana and Candela and all his relatives, colleagues and loved ones, he will always be remembered by Madridistas and all football fans as one of their greatest." FIFA President Gianni Infantino said, “I am deeply saddened to learn of Paco Gento’s passing today at the age of 88. One of the greatest players of his generation, Paco leaves behind a lifetime of memories for all fans of football, but especially those of Spain and Real Madrid. Our thoughts and best wishes go to Paco’s family and friends, to Real Madrid, to the Royal Spanish Football Federation (RFEF) and to all those who treasure memories of this great player.”

Legacy
Regarded as one of the greatest Spanish players of all time and one of the greatest ever players in his position, Gento was an extremely fast left winger, which made him an effective assist provider with high accuracy in his crosses.

Career statistics

Club

International

Scores and results list Spain's goal tally first, score column indicates score after each Gento goal.

Honours

Real Madrid
La Liga (12): 1953–54, 1954–55, 1956–57, 1957–58, 1960–61, 1961–62, 1962–63, 1963–64, 1964–65, 1966–67, 1967–68, 1968–69
Copa del Generalísimo: 1961–62, 1969–70
European Cup (6): 1955–56, 1956–57, 1957–58, 1958–59, 1959–60, 1965–66
Intercontinental Cup: 1960

Semi-official
Latin Cup: 1955, 1957

Non-official
Small Club World Cup: 1956

Individual
World Soccer World XI: 1960, 1961, 1962
Golden Foot Legends Award: 2004
World Soccer: The 100 Greatest Footballers of All Time
IFFHS Legends

Records
Most La Liga titles: 12
Most European Cup titles: 6
Most European Cup final appearances: 8 (tied with Paolo Maldini)

See also
 List of La Liga players (400+ appearances)
 List of Real Madrid CF records and statistics

References

 Ball, Phil (2011) Morbo: The Story of Spanish Football. WSC Books.

External links

 
 
 
 Francisco Gento at Real Madrid 
 Biography at Real Madrid Fans 
 National team data 
 International Appearances and Goals at RSSSF
 Goals in European Cups at RSSSF

1933 births
2022 deaths
Spanish footballers
Footballers from Cantabria
Association football forwards
La Liga players
Rayo Cantabria players
Racing de Santander players
Real Madrid CF players
Spain B international footballers
Spain international footballers
1962 FIFA World Cup players
1966 FIFA World Cup players
Spanish football managers
Real Madrid Castilla managers
CD Castellón managers
Granada CF managers
UEFA Champions League winning players
People from the Bay of Santander
Gento family
SD Unión Club players